Sirdaryo is a district of Sirdaryo Region in Uzbekistan. The capital lies at the city Sirdaryo. The district consists of 2 cities (Sirdaryo, Baxt), 4 urban-type settlements (Quyosh, Malik, Ziyokor, J.Mamanov) and 9 rural communities.

References

Districts of Uzbekistan
Sirdaryo Region